Kallan Kappalil Thanne is a 1992 Indian Malayalam film, directed by Prasanth, starring Jagadish, Siddique, Maathu, Suchitra and Poojappura Ravi in the lead roles.

Plot
Murali is a pharmaceutical representative who is in love with Gayathri. He lives in a room above a restaurant owned by Gayathri's father, a Tamil man who owns a teashop named Swami. Jose and Preman are Murali's friends who come to stay with Murali in his room. It provokes Swami, the owner of the lodge. He and his friend Appunni attempt various tricks to put them out of that lodge including through police force, but they recover from all. Swami, by Appunni's guidance, calls Payyoli Ananthan Gurukkal as a last attempt. However, Appavi Appukuttan, Ananthan Gurukal's twin brother takes up the job and goes as Ananthan. He makes friendship with all the men in the rented room. Also Appukuttan falls in love with Swami's youngest daughter Savithri. At last, Swami realizes they all are fooling him. He call his relative rowdy Ottapalam Venkkidi to help him and he enlists Cheenkanni Ramu, a better rowdy. The real Kalari Gurukkal Ananthan switches in for his brother and beats the rowdy to a pulp. The film ends with Appukuttan as the new Manager of the restaurant after marrying Swami's daughter.

Cast
 Jagadish as Kalari Gurukkal Ananthan/Appavi Appukuttan (double role)
 Siddique as Murali
 Maathu as Savithri
 Suchitra Murali as Gayathri
 Ashokan as Preman
 Maniyanpilla Raju as Adv. Jose Kurien	
 Mala Aravindan as Appunni maashu	
 Poojappura Ravi as Swami
 Sukumari	as Mami
 Sainudeen as Venkkidi
 Kunchan as Hotel Helper
 Mannar Radhakrishnan as Police Inspector
 Kaduvakulam Antony as Sukumaran Gurukkal
 Thrissur Elsy as Ananthan & Appukuttan's mother
 Thesni Khan as Rajani
 Kundara Johnny as Cheengani Ramu

Sound Track 

The songs were composed by Mohan Sithara and the lyrics were penned by R. K. Damodaran.

References

External links

1992 films
1990s Malayalam-language films
Films directed by Thevalakkara Chellappan
Films scored by Mohan Sithara